The Green Mountain Arrow Site is an assemblage of arranged stones in Fremont County, Wyoming. The site includes seven stone cairns, a  directional arrow, three possible stone circles and lines of small stones. It is one of relatively few stone effigies found in the northern Great Plans and Rocky Mountains.

The site was placed on the National Register of Historic Places on March 12, 1986.

References

External links
 Green Mountain Arrow at the Wyoming State Historic Preservation Office
 Green Mountain Arrow, Stone Circle at the Wyoming State Historic Preservation Office's photo archive

		
National Register of Historic Places in Fremont County, Wyoming
Archaeological sites on the National Register of Historic Places in Wyoming